The Electoral district of Avoca was an electoral district of the old unicameral Victorian Legislative Council of 1851 to 1856. Victoria being a colony in Australia at the time.
Avoca was added to the Council in 1855, along with four other districts.

The Electoral district of Avoca's area included the parishes of Amherst, Carisbrook, Maryborough, Avoca, Tarnagulla, and Burrembeep.

Avoca was abolished along with all the other districts in the Legislative Council in 1856 as part of the new Parliament of Victoria. New Provinces were created that made up the Legislative Council, which was the upper house from 1856.

Member

References

External links
1855 map of the Electoral District of Avoca at the State Library of Victoria

Former electoral districts of Victorian Legislative Council
1855 establishments in Australia
1856 disestablishments in Australia